"For the Cool in You" is a song co-written, co-produced and performed by American contemporary R&B singer Babyface. The song was written by Babyface, Daryl Simmons, and produced by the former, Simmons and L.A. Reid. It is the opening track on his third studio album of the same name and was issued as the album's first single on August 10, 1993 by Epic Records. The song peaked at #81 on the Billboard Hot 100 in 1993.

In 1994, "For the Cool in You" was nominated for a Grammy Award for Best R&B Vocal Performance, Male; but lost to "A Song for You" by Ray Charles.

Former NBA player and jazz musician Wayman Tisdale covered the song titled "Jazz in You", which appeared on his 1995 debut album Power Forward.

It was notably featured in a Family Matters episode titled "Dr. Urkel and Mr. Cool".

Music video

The official music video for the song was directed by Andy Morahan.

Charts

Weekly charts

Year-end charts

References

External links
 
 

1992 songs
1993 songs
1993 singles
Babyface (musician) songs
Epic Records singles
Music videos directed by Andy Morahan
New jack swing songs
Song recordings produced by Babyface (musician)
Song recordings produced by L.A. Reid
Song recordings produced by Daryl Simmons
Songs written by Babyface (musician)
Songs written by Daryl Simmons